Euphaea splendens, the shining gossamerwing, is a species of damselfly in family Euphaeidae. It is endemic to Sri Lanka.

References

External links
 https://web.archive.org/web/20150219172210/http://www.wht.lk/storage/book_downloads/CorrigendaAddendum.pdf
 http://www.wildreach.com/reptile/animals/dragonflies.php
 https://www.flickr.com/photos/29388452@N07/9372839840/
 http://www.jetwingeco.com/sites/default/files/publications/GPG_2007_12_07_part_02.pdf
 http://bazscampionnaturephotography.co.uk/photo_8997770.html

Endemic fauna of Sri Lanka
Insects of Sri Lanka
Insects described in 1853